The XITS font project is an OpenType implementation of STIX fonts version 1.x with math support for mathematical and scientific publishing. The main mission of the Times-like XITS typeface is to provide a version of STIX fonts enriched with the OpenType MATH extension.

Features
 OpenType mathematical layout features needed for use with new formula editor in MS Office 2007 and the new TeX engines XeTeX and LuaTeX, providing high quality mathematical typesetting.
 Right to left and Arabic mathematical notation support (since version 1.011).
 General OpenType features in text fonts (Kerning, Standard Ligatures, Fractions, Small Caps, and Inferior, Superior and Oldstyle Figures).

See also
 STIX Fonts project
 Unicode typefaces
 List of fonts
Other OpenType fonts with mathematical layout extensions:
 Asana Math
 Latin Modern Math
XITS is shipped with:
 TeX Live

References

External links
 XITS font project official site
 XITS at CTAN

Open-source typefaces
Free software Unicode typefaces
Greek typefaces
Symbol typefaces
Mathematical OpenType typefaces
Typefaces and fonts introduced in 2010